The Port of Kuala Sungai Linggi, or Sungai Linggi commercially known as Linggi International Floating Transshipment & Trading HUB (LIFT-HUB), is a transshipment area for liquid bulk transshipments and break-bulking from western regions such as the Middle East to eastern regions or Australia located offshore of Linggi River in the Malacca Strait. It is among the largest designated Ship-to-ship cargo transfer area in Malaysia. Gazetted in 2006, Port of Sungai Linggi covers area of 154 km² (45 sq mi) and has catered over 1000 tankers including ULCC and VLCC's since its beginning. The name "Kuala Linggi" was named after the name of the nearby river, Linggi River. Linggi means 'stem' in Bugis and refers to the strongest vertical plate at the bow of a ship.

Location 

The Port of Sungai Linggi is located in between the borders of Negeri Sembilan and Malacca states and accessible via air from the nearest international airport KLIA (1 hours) and by road from Singapore (5 hours).
LIFT-HUB is located Approx. 20 n.m. SE of Port Dickson and 2.0 n.m. NW of Sungai Udang port (Lat. 02° 23′ 19.66" N, Long. 101° 58′ 34.90" E) on the Malacca coast, west coast of Malaysia and accessible via Strait of Malacca.

Characteristics 

 Seaport area covers about 45 sq NM
 Depth at designated transfer area ranging from 25–30 m
 Good holding ground, with tidal stream less than 2.5 knots.
 Max. draft for approaching 22m with under keel clearance of 3.5 m

Port limits 

Sungai Linggi port limits area is 9 nm by 5 nm bounded by the following co-ordinates:

Charts 

For charts reference please see:
 MAL Chart No. 532
 BA Charts No. 1141
 BA Charts No. 3946
 BA Malacca Strait Pilot, NP 44

References

External links 
 http://www.tag-marine.com/

Kuala Sungai Linggi